The Greco-Roman heavyweight competition at the 1912 Summer Olympics was part of the wrestling programme.

The competition used a form of double-elimination tournament. Rather than using the brackets that are now standard for double-elimination contests (and which assure that each match is between two competitors with the same number of losses), each wrestler drew a number. Each man would face off against the wrestler with the next number, provided he had not already faced that wrestler and that the wrestler was not from the same nation as him (unless this was necessary to avoid byes).

When only three wrestlers remain (the medalists), the double-elimination halts and a special final round is used to determine the order of the medals.

Results

First round

17 wrestlers began the competition.

Second round

17 wrestlers started the second round, 9 with no losses and 8 with one.  Pelander, who had had a bye in the first round, wrestled twice in the second.

6 wrestlers were eliminated, the most possible given that 3 of the 9 matches were between two undefeated wrestlers.  2 survived potential elimination by eliminating another wrestler.  3 received their first loss, while 6 remained undefeated.

Third round

11 wrestlers started the third round, 6 with no losses and 5 with one.

3 wrestlers were eliminated, the most possible given that 2 of the 5 matches were between two undefeated wrestlers.  2 survived potential elimination, 1 by eliminating another wrestler and 1 via a bye.  2 received their first loss, while 4 remained undefeated.

Fourth round

8 wrestlers started the fourth round, 4 with no losses and 4 with one.

The matches in this round were all symmetrical in terms of number of losses by the wrestlers involved.  Two involved a pair of wrestlers with one loss each, with the other two being contested by the four undefeated wrestlers.  This led to two men being eliminated, two surviving potential elimination, two receiving their first loss, and two remaining undefeated.

Fifth round

6 wrestlers started the fifth round, 2 with no losses and 4 with one.

In what could have been the last elimination round, the two undefeated wrestlers each faced off against a man with one loss.  Olin's survival of his potential elimination by defeating Saarela was the first instance of a man with one loss defeating an undefeated wrestler in the event; it was followed closely by Neser's defeat of Viljaama.  Each of those four men advanced to the sixth round along with Jensen, who had won the only certain loser-out match of the round against Backenius.

Sixth round

5 wrestlers started the fourth round, all with one loss.

With only five men left, and all having a loss, the sixth round would have consisted of two matches that were both sure to be loser-out.  Viljaama, however, withdrew after having suffered his first loss.  This left only one match in the sixth round, and Olin and Jensen had the byes.  Neser faced Saarela; the German was unable to survive elimination a second time in a row and fell to the Finn.

Final round

With three wrestlers remaining, all of the previous results were ignored for the final round.

References
 
 

Greco-Roman heavyweight